Charlottetown-Winsloe is a provincial electoral district for the Legislative Assembly of Prince Edward Island, Canada. It was created prior to the 2019 election from parts of the former districts Charlottetown-Sherwood, West Royalty-Springvale and York-Oyster Bed.

The riding is located in the city of Charlottetown, including the community of Winsloe and parts of the neighbourhood of Sherwood.

Members

Election results

Charlottetown-Winsloe, 2019–present

|-

Referendum and plebiscite results

2019 electoral reform referendum
The 2019 Prince Edward Island electoral reform referendum was held on April 23, 2019.

References

External links
Elections PEI: District 10 Charlottetown-Winsloe

Politics of Charlottetown
Prince Edward Island provincial electoral districts